Verginia, or Virginia (c. 465 BC449 BC), was the subject of a story of ancient Rome, related in Livy's Ab Urbe Condita.

The story of Verginia 

In 451 BC, Appius Claudius began to lust after Verginia, a beautiful plebeian girl and the daughter of Lucius Verginius, a respected centurion. Verginia was betrothed to Lucius Icilius, a former tribune of the plebs, and when she rejected Claudius, Claudius had one of his clients, Marcus Claudius, claim that she was actually his slave. Marcus Claudius then abducted her while she was on her way to school. The crowd in the Forum objected to this, as both Verginius and Icilius were well-respected men, and they forced Marcus Claudius to bring the case before the decemvirs, led by Appius Claudius himself. Verginius was recalled from the field to defend his daughter, and Icilius, after threats of violence, succeeded in having Verginia returned to her house while the court waited for her father to appear. Claudius tried to have his own supporters intercept the messengers sent to summon Verginius, but they arrived too late to delay Verginius' arrival.

When Verginius arrived two days later he gathered his supporters in the Forum. Claudius, however, would not let him speak, and declared that Verginia was indeed Marcus Claudius' slave. Appius Claudius had brought an armed escort with him and accused the citizens of sedition. The supporters of Verginius left the Forum rather than cause any violence, and Verginius begged to question his daughter himself. Claudius agreed to this, but Verginius grabbed a knife and, at the Shrine of Venus Cloacina, he stabbed Verginia, the only way he felt he could uphold her freedom and virtues. Verginius and Icilius were arrested, and their supporters returned to attack the lictors and destroy their fasces. This led to the overthrow of the decemviri and the re-establishment of the Roman Republic.

References to Verginia in Literature 
Livy compared this story to the rape of Lucretia and the overthrow of the monarchy in 509 BC. Modern historians view the history of Roman women such as Verginia and Lucretia as a narrative supporting traditional Roman values where women become symbols of these values and symbolize criticisms against the political reality of Roman government. The people of Rome were already angry with the decemviri for not calling the proper elections, taking bribes, and other abuses after taking power within the Roman government and the story of Verginia attested to this discontent.

The tale is retold, with varying fidelity, in several works of Western literature, including Geoffrey Chaucer's "The Physician's Tale" in his Canterbury Tales, in Thomas Babington Macaulay's Lays of Ancient Rome, and in the play Appius and Virginia by John Webster and Thomas Heywood.

Verginia is mentioned in William Shakespeare's Titus Andronicus.  Her story is retold in Steven Saylor's Roma.

See also
The Story of Virginia (Botticelli)
Verginia gens

Footnotes

External links

460s BC births
449 BC deaths
Year of birth unknown
Characters in Roman mythology
5th-century BC Romans
5th-century BC Roman women
Verginii
Deaths by stabbing in Rome
Republican era slaves and freedmen